was a town located in Nishitonami District, Toyama Prefecture, Japan.

As of 2003, the town had an estimated population of 20,056 and a density of 119.35 persons per km². The total area was 168.05 km².

On November 1, 2004, Fukumitsu, along with the towns of Fukuno, Inami and Jōhana, and the villages of Inokuchi, Kamitaira, Taira and Toga (all from Higashitonami District), was merged to create the city of Nanto.

References

External links
 Nanto City official website 

Dissolved municipalities of Toyama Prefecture
Nanto, Toyama